There were 30 on wheelchairs and 110 on foot athletes representing the country at the 2000 Summer Paralympics.

Medal table

See also
France at the 2000 Summer Olympics
France at the Paralympics

References

Bibliography

External links
International Paralympic Committee

Nations at the 2000 Summer Paralympics
Paralympics
2000